Matt Vinc (born June 9, 1982 in St. Catharines, Ontario) is a Canadian professional lacrosse goaltender who plays for the Buffalo Bandits in the National Lacrosse League and for the Peterborough Lakers of the Major Series Lacrosse.

He was a member of Team Canada He is also a teacher and lacrosse coach at Denis Morris Catholic High School in St. Catharines.

Junior career
Vinc had an outstanding junior career. He played for the St. Catharines Athletics in the OLA Junior A Lacrosse League from 1999 to 2003. His accomplishments playing for the A's include:

 1 OLA Jr.A regular season MVP award
 3 OLA Jr.A playoff MVP awards
 3 OLA Jr.A championships (2001–2003)
 3 Bob Meleville Memorial Awards (lowest team total goals)
 2 Minto Cup National championships (2001, 2003)
 1 Minto Cup MVP Award
 B.W. Evans Award (Top Graduating Player).

High school career
Vinc played high school field lacrosse at Holy Cross Catholic Secondary School, along with fellow future professional lacrosse players Billy Dee Smith, Craig Conn, and Sean Greenhalgh. In five years, he helped the Holy Cross Raiders to win 2 gold medals, 1 silver, and 1 bronze at the OFSAA field lacrosse championships. This would begin a dynasty for the Holy Cross lacrosse program to excel in Niagara and Ontario competition.

College career
Vinc is also a graduate of Canisius College, where he played long-stick defense and was named the college's Male Athlete of the Year.

NLL career
Vinc was acquired by the San Jose Stealth in the 2005 NLL entry draft in the first round (sixth overall).  In the 2006 NLL season, Vinc played sparingly with the Stealth.  Following the season, he was acquired by the New York Titans in the 2006 NLL expansion draft.  In 2007, he took over the starting goaltender role for the Titans. In 2009, Vinc guided his team to a 10–6 record for a three way tie for first place in the Eastern Division with the Buffalo Bandits and the Boston Blazers. The Titans were awarded the Eastern Division regular season championship by way of tie breakers. On May 9, in the Eastern Division playoff championship game, Vinc stopped 41 out of 44 shots and kept the high-powered offense of the Buffalo Bandits to only three goals as the Titans defeated Buffalo 9–3.  Vinc allowed 1 more goal than the National Lacrosse League playoff record of 2 goals against in a game, which was set by Bob Watson, and the Toronto Rock defeated the Philadelphia Wings 13–2 during a 1999 semi-final playoff game.

Vinc became a member of the Orlando Titans when the franchise moved to Florida for the 2010 season.  When the team folded after that season, Vinc was chosen first overall in the dispersal draft, sending him to the Colorado Mammoth.  As he teaches high school in St. Catharines, Ontario, however, he did not want to play in Colorado. In October 2010, he was thus traded to the Rochester Knighthawks in a significant trade that sent Vinc and transition player Matt Zash to Rochester in exchange for superstar attackman John Grant, Jr. and defenseman Mac Allen. Draft picks were also exchanged.

Vinc has won a league record eight Goaltender of the Year awards:
 2010 with the Orlando Titans
 2011, 2013, 2014, 2015, and 2018 with the Knighthawks
 2019 and 2022 with the Bandits

Heading into the 2023 NLL season, Inside Lacrosse named Vinc the #2 goalie in the NLL.

Statistics

NLL
Reference:

Awards

References

1982 births
Living people
Canadian lacrosse players
Canisius College alumni
Canisius Golden Griffins men's lacrosse players
Lacrosse people from Ontario
National Lacrosse League major award winners
New York Titans (lacrosse) players
Orlando Titans players
San Jose Stealth players
Sportspeople from St. Catharines
Hamilton Nationals players
Lacrosse goaltenders